William Weber may refer to:

William Alfred Weber (1918–2020), American botanist
William Gilmore Weber (born 1963), American guitarist, former member of rock band The Murder Junkies
William V. Weber (1901–1989), Michigan State Representative
Ben Weber (composer) (William Jennings Bryan Weber, 1916–1979), American composer
Bill Weber (born 1957), former NBC and TNT sports commentator
Wilhelm Eduard Weber (1804–1891), German physicist

See also
William Webber (disambiguation)
Wilhelm Weber (disambiguation)